Anna Manwah Lo  (born 17 June 1950) is an Alliance Party politician in Northern Ireland. She was a Member of the Legislative Assembly (MLA) for Belfast South from 2007 to 2016. She is a former president of the Alliance Party.

Early life 
Lo was born in North Point, British Hong Kong to Cantonese Chinese parents. She attended Shau Kei Wan East Government Secondary School. She moved to Northern Ireland in 1974 after meeting journalist David Watson.

She spent her early years in the country working for the BBC and the Royal Ulster Constabulary as an interpreter. In 1978, she started an English evening class for Chinese people in Northern Ireland.

Career

Political career 
Lo was elected to the Northern Ireland Assembly for Belfast South in the 2007 assembly election. She is the first and, to date, only ethnic-minority politician elected at a regional level in Northern Ireland and the first politician born in East Asia elected to any legislative body in the United Kingdom.

Lo stood as an Alliance Party candidate at the 2007 Northern Ireland Assembly election and was elected in Belfast South. After her re-election in 2011, Lo was appointed as the chair of the Northern Ireland Assembly's Environment Committee. She used this role to influence the Local Government Bill. As a result of her amendments, the new Councils have greater levels of openness and transparency as the audio of the main Council meetings is now recorded and Council papers are placed online. She further improved the freedom of the press at the new Councils by ensuring that journalists and the public can use social media during meetings.

She was selected as the Alliance Party's candidate for the Northern Ireland constituency in the 2014 European Parliament election. She won the best ever European election performance for the party.

Lo has been the target of racial abuse by Ulster loyalists and did not stand for re-election as MLA in 2016 as a result.

Personal life
Lo is a social worker and former chair of the Northern Ireland Chinese Welfare Association. She was awarded an MBE for services to Ethnic Minorities in the 2000 New Year Honours.

Since 2007 Lo has suffered from non-Hodgkin lymphoma and must maintain a vegetarian diet to combat the illness.

Political views
Lo has declared her preference for Irish unification. She describes herself as anti-colonial and has said the partition of Ireland was "artificial". Lo also refers to herself as "a socialist and a republican in the international sense").

She expressed her outrage at First Minister Peter Robinson's defence of Pastor James McConnell, who was accused of making Islamophobic remarks. She has stated that she views the Democratic Unionist Party to be racist because of decisions like those.

Lo supported moves to liberalise abortion laws in Northern Ireland and voted to extend the Abortion Act 1967, which already extends the rest of the United Kingdom, to Northern Ireland.

See also
 European politicians of Chinese descent

References

External links
 Official website

1950 births
Alliance Party of Northern Ireland MLAs
Alumni of Ulster University
British social workers
Female members of the Northern Ireland Assembly
Hong Kong Taoists
Hong Kong emigrants to Northern Ireland
Interpreters
Irish republicans
Living people
Members of the Order of the British Empire
Naturalised citizens of the United Kingdom
Northern Ireland MLAs 2007–2011
Northern Ireland MLAs 2011–2016
Northern Ireland politicians of Chinese descent
People from British Hong Kong
Socialists from Northern Ireland